The 1925 Paris–Tours was the 20th edition of the Paris–Tours cycle race and was held on 3 May 1925. The race started in Paris and finished in Tours. The race was won by Denis Verschueren.

General classification

References

1925 in French sport
1925
May 1925 sports events